John Bossewell (died 1580) was an English heraldic writer.

Life
Bossewell was, on his own account, from the north of England, and a gentleman. He appears to have acted as a notary public.

Works
As an antiquary devoted to heraldic study, Bossewell was a close follower of Gerard Legh. The first edition of his Workes of Armorie was published by Richard Totell in 1572, with a reprint in 1597. The first part, entitled "Concordes", is an abridgement of Legh's Accedens of Armory. Like Legh, he covered  symbolism and allegory, conceits and fables.

Notes

 
Attribution
 

Year of birth missing
1580 deaths
English male writers